"Flicka Da Wrist" is the only single by American rapper Chedda Da Connect. It peaked at number 94 on the US Billboard Hot 100.

Breakthrough
In 2015, "Flicka Da Wrist" became a huge hit in the United States, going viral online and taking clubs and radio airwaves by storm nationwide. The single, which was released 3 March 2015, has been remixed by numerous rap artists such as Fetty Wap, 2 Chainz, Migos, Soulja Boy, T.I., Rick Ross, Kevin Gates and many more. 

The song became a popular meme on Vine, with characters such as Spider-Man and Squidward (from 'SpongeBob SquarePants') "dancing" to the song in short clips. 

It has been supported on social media by numerous celebrities. In the NBA it was used by players such as James Harden and LeBron James as a celebratory move.

The song entered the Billboard chart's weeks after gaining online popularity at number 94.

Music video
"Flicka Da Wrist" was uploaded on WorldstarHipHop's YouTube channel on March 4, 2015. The video consists of Chedda dancing around and flicking his wrist with his friends.

Remix
The official remix features Fetty Wap,  Boosie Badazz, Yo Gotti & Boston George

Chart performance
On the week of May 16, 2015, "Flicka Da Wrist" debuted and peaked at number 94 on the Billboard Hot 100, dropped four spots to number 98 the next week before leaving the chart. The song made two reappearances on the chart before leaving the next week: number 100 the week of June 13 and number 98 the week of July 4.

References

2015 songs
2015 debut singles